Triple Play is a form of home entertainment optical disc distribution which provides the buyer with a film or TV series in three different formats in a single keep case. The formats are Blu-ray Disc, DVD, and a digital copy. In some cases, an Ultraviolet copy will be included in place of a DVD.

See also
Digital copy
Blu-ray Disc
DVD
Ultraviolet

Notes

Video storage
Packaging